John Trevorrow (born 18 May 1949) is a former Australian racing cyclist. He won the Australian national road race title in 1978, 1979 and 1980. He also competed at the 1972 Summer Olympics.

He is presently the race director for the Herald Sun Tour, an Australian stage race on the UCI Oceania Tour. He founded the Bay Classic Series in 1989 and is the current race director.

References

External links

1949 births
Living people
Australian male cyclists
Cyclists from Melbourne
Olympic cyclists of Australia
Cyclists at the 1972 Summer Olympics
Commonwealth Games medallists in cycling
Commonwealth Games bronze medallists for Australia
Cyclists at the 1970 British Commonwealth Games
Medallists at the 1970 British Commonwealth Games